Mikhin may refer to:

Mikhail Mikhin, Soviet pilot
Mikhin, Iran, a village in Qazvin Province

See also
 Mehin (disambiguation)